The Baird Lecture is a lectureship that was endowed by James Baird to promote the Christian religion.

History and endowment
In 1873 James Baird established The Baird Trust and gave into its care £500,000 to be used for aggressive Christian work. A part of the income of this fund was to provide for a series of lectures in Glasgow and also, if required, at one other of the Scottish university towns. Each course was to be delivered by a minister of the Church of Scotland, who could be reappointed, and was to consist of at least six lectures.

Catalogue of titles
1873: The Inspiration of the Holy Scriptures, by Robert Jamieson
1874: The Mysteries of Christianity, by Thomas Jackson Crawford
1875: Endowed Territorial Work, by William Smith
1876: Theism, by Robert Flint
1877: Anti-Theistic Theories, by Robert Flint
1879: Messianic Prophecy, by Paton James Gloag
1880: Historical Development of Supernatural Religion, by John Christie
1881: Natural Elements of Revealed Theology, by George Matheson
1882: The Westminster Assembly, by Alexander Ferrier Mitchell
1883: St Paul’s Use of the Terms Flesh and Spirit, by Prof Wm Dickson
1885: The Revelation of St John, by Prof William Milligan
1887: The Church of Christ, by Prof Archibald Hamilton Charteris
1889: Early Religion of Israel, by Prof J Robertson
1891: The Ascension and Heavenly Priesthood of our Lord, by Prof Wm Milligan
1892: Sacrifice: Its Prophecy and Fulfilment, by Archibald Scott
1895: The Scottish Church in Christendom, by Prof H Cowan
1897: Apostolic ministry in the Scottish Church, by Prof Robert Herbert Story
1899: The Scottish Reformation, by Alexander Ferrier Mitchell
1901: The Church and its Social Mission, by Very Rev J Marshall Lang
1903: The Ministry and Sacraments of the Church of Scotland, by Very Revd Donald Macleod
1905: The Rule of Faith, by Prof W P Paterson
1907: The Four Gospels in the Earliest Church History, by Prof Thomas Nicol
1909: Modern Substitutes for Christianity, by Very Rev Pearson McAdam Muir
1911: New Testament Criticism: Its History and Results, by Revd J A McClymont
1913: Christian Freedom, by Prof W M McGregor
1915: The Apostles of India, by Revd James Nicoll Ogilvie
1917: The Idea of Immortality, by Prof G Galloway
1920: The Christian Vindication of Patriotism, by Robert Stevenson
1922: Jeremiah, by Prof George Adam Smith
1924: Religious Experience, by R H Fisher
1926: Music in Church Worship, by G W Stewart
1928: The Idealism of Christian Ethics, by G Walker
1929: The New Testament and its Transmission, by Prof George Milligan
1932: The Riddle of the World, by Prof David S Cairns
1934: Post Exilic Judaism, by Prof Adam Welch
1935: Parish and Parish Church, by Revd P D Thomson
1942: Youth in the new Order, by W M Wightman
1946: New Forms of the Old Faith, by Revd James Black
1947: The Chaplains in the Church of Scotland, by Revd T B Stewart Thomson
1949: The Epistle to the Hebrews, by Prof Wm Manson
1950: Church and Ministry, by Prof G. D. Henderson
1955: A History of Worship in the Church of Scotland, by Revd W D Maxwell
1960: Christian Faith and the Providential Order, by Rev Archibald Campbell Craig
1965: History and Duties of the Office of Elder, by Rev G M Dryburgh
1971: Ethics in a Permissive Society, by Prof Wm Barclay
1975: Message, Media, Mission, by Revd R F Falconer
1978: Saltire and Thistle, by Revd J.BP Bulloch
1985: Kirk by Divine Right, by Very Rev Andrew Herron
1990: Music’s Magic Lost: Can it be regained?, by Revd Ian Mackenzie
2004: Netting Citizens, by Rev. Johnston McKay
2007: Celebrating 150 years of Scottish Scholarship
2009:  What should they know of preaching who only preaching know? by Very Revd Dr Andrew McLellan

External links
 The Baird Trust website with text of all the lectures as searchable .pdf files.

1873 establishments in Scotland
Christian theological lectures
Church of Scotland
Evangelists
Lecture series
Scottish books
Series of books
Universities in Scotland